Kančioginas − village in Lithuania, Ignalina District Municipality, Ignalina part of south, Sirvėta Regional Park edge, Utena County. 5 kilometres northwest of Ceikiniai village. Peculiar planned rural structure, valuable folk architectural complex.

Nature and Geography 
Western village stream flows Kančiogina, southwest of the lake lies there Kančioginas lake.

External links 
 Kančioginas information

References 

Ignalina District Municipality
Villages in Utena County